The eighty-first Minnesota Legislature first convened on January 5, 1999. The 67 members of the Minnesota Senate were elected during the General Election of November 5, 1996, and the 134 members of the Minnesota House of Representatives were elected during the General Election of November 3, 1998.

Sessions 
The legislature met in a regular session from January 5, 1999, to May 17, 1999. A continuation of the regular session was held between February 1, 2000, and May 17, 2000. There were no special sessions of the 81st Legislature, and the Legislature met for a total of 118 regular legislative days.

Party summary 
Resignations and new members are discussed in the "Membership changes" section, below.

Senate

House of Representatives

Leadership

Senate 
President of the Senate
Allan Spear (DFL-Minneapolis)

Senate Majority Leader
Roger Moe (DFL-Erskine)

Senate Minority Leader
Dick Day (R-Owatonna)

House of Representatives 
Speaker of the House
Steve Sviggum (R-Kenyon)

House Majority Leader
Tim Pawlenty (R-Eagen)

House Minority Leader
Tom Pugh (DFL-South St. Paul)

Members

Senate

House of Representatives

Membership changes

Senate

House of Representatives

Notes

References 

 Minnesota Legislators Past & Present - Session Search Results (Session 81, Senate)
 Minnesota Legislators Past & Present - Session Search Results (Session 81, House)

81st
1990s in Minnesota
2000s in Minnesota
1999 in Minnesota
2000 in Minnesota
1999 U.S. legislative sessions
2000 U.S. legislative sessions